The men's freestyle 74 kg is a competition featured at the 2017 Russian National Freestyle Wrestling Championships, and was held in Nazran, Ingushetia, Russia on June 14.

Medalists

Results
Legend
F — Won by fall
WO — Won by walkover (bye)

Finals

Top half

Section 1

Section 2

Repechage

References 
https://vk.com/doc9602940_447227843?hash=8e056884e94f80fbc8&dl=3233f7d26ac7724a6d

Men's freestyle 74kg